Colin Coosemans (born 3 August 1992) is a Belgian professional football player currently playing for Anderlecht.

Career
He made his professional debut for Club Brugge on 30 September 2010 in an 2010–11 UEFA Europa League game against Villarreal. On 3 October 2010 he made his league debut against Gent. After his impressive performances in early 2011, he was briefly nicknamed "The Magnet". However, after being replaced as first keeper by Bojan Jorgačević and two coach changes at Club Brugge, he was allowed to leave on loan to Waasland-Beveren during the 2012–13 season.

In 2017 he made a fantastic performance as a field player, attempting a dribble, losing a ball, recovering it and delivering a last minute assist in one of Belgium national league matches.

Career statistics

References

External links
 Profile by UEFA

1992 births
Living people
Belgian footballers
Club Brugge KV players
S.K. Beveren players
K.V. Mechelen players
K.A.A. Gent players
R.S.C. Anderlecht players
Belgian Pro League players
Belgium youth international footballers
Belgium under-21 international footballers
Association football goalkeepers
Footballers from Ghent